Hostage is a 2005 American action thriller film produced by and starring Bruce Willis and directed by Florent Emilio Siri. The film was based on the 2001 novel of the same name by Robert Crais, and was adapted for the screen by Doug Richardson.

The film earned negative reviews from critics and was not a financial success, grossing $77 million against its $75 million budget.

Plot
Former L.A. SWAT officer Jeff Talley is a hostage negotiator in Los Angeles. One day, Talley negotiates with an abusive man who has taken his own wife and son hostage after learning his wife was cheating on him. Shortly after Talley denies a SWAT commander's request to give snipers the order to open fire, the despondent husband kills his wife, son, and himself. Traumatized, Talley moves with his family and becomes police chief in Bristo Camino, a suburban hamlet in nearby Ventura County.

A year later, Talley finds himself in another hostage situation. Two teenagers, Dennis Kelly and his brother Kevin, and their accomplice Marshall "Mars" Krupcheck take hostage Walter Smith and his two children, teenage Jennifer and young Tommy, in Smith's house after a failed robbery attempt. The first officer to respond is shot twice by Mars just before Talley arrives. Talley attempts to rescue the officer, but she dies in front of him. Traumatized and unwilling to put himself through another tragedy, Talley hands authority over to the Ventura County Sheriff's Department and leaves.

Smith has been laundering money for a mysterious criminal syndicate through offshore shell corporations. He was preparing to turn over a batch of important encrypted files recorded on a DVD when he was taken hostage. To prevent the incriminating evidence from being discovered, the syndicate orders someone known only as the Watchman to kidnap Talley's wife and daughter. Talley is instructed to return to the hostage scene, regain authority, and stall for time until the organization can launch its own attack against Smith's house.

Dennis forces Kevin and Mars to tie up the children, while he knocks out Smith and finds a large amount of cash. In an attempt to end the standoff and secure the DVDs himself, Talley meets with Dennis and agrees to provide a helicopter in exchange for half of the money. When the helicopter arrives, Dennis and Kevin bring the money to Talley and prepare to leave, but Mars refuses to leave without Jennifer, with whom he has become infatuated. Talley says the helicopter will only carry three additional people and insists that Jennifer stay behind, but the deal breaks down and the boys return to the house. Talley learns that Mars is a psychopathic killer who could turn on the hostages and his own accomplices at any moment. Mars does, in fact, kill Dennis and Kevin, just as Kevin is about to release the children.

The syndicate sends fake FBI agents to recover the DVD and they storm the house; Talley is instructed to not go near the house. Jennifer stabs Mars and locks herself and Tommy in the panic room. Hearing their screams, Talley breaches the house and is attacked by Mars, who then kills most of the fake agents using his pistol and multiple Molotov cocktails. Mars is then shot in the side by the only surviving agent. The agent tracks down Talley and the children, and demands the encrypted DVD. After Talley gives him the DVD, Mars reappears, distracting the agent long enough to be killed by Talley. Mars then prepares to throw his last Molotov, but collapses to his knees, weakened by his injuries. He makes eye contact with Jennifer, then drops the Molotov and immolates himself.

Talley escapes with the children by shooting the indoor glass waterfall, which extinguishes the fire. He and a recovered Smith then go to a rundown inn where Talley's wife and daughter are being held captive by the Watchman and his crew. Smith, feigning hatred for Talley, is freed in exchange for the family. While demanding that the Watchman kill Talley, Smith shoots the Watchman. This allows Talley to kill the other gunmen and rescue his family.

Cast
 Bruce Willis as Police Chief Jeff Talley
 Kevin Pollak as Walter Smith
 Jimmy Bennett as Tommy Smith
 Michelle Horn as Jennifer Smith
 Ben Foster as Marshall "Mars" Krupcheck
 Jonathan Tucker as Dennis Kelly
 Marshall Allman as Kevin Kelly
 Serena Scott Thomas as Jane Talley
 Rumer Willis as Amanda Talley
 Kim Coates as The Watchman / Glen Howell 
 Robert Knepper as Wil Bechler
 Tina Lifford as Deputy Sheriff Laura Shoemaker
 Ransford Doherty as Officer Mike Anders
 Marjean Holden as Officer Carol Flores
 Michael D. Roberts as Bob Ridley, Paramedic
 Art LaFleur as Officer Bill Jorgenson
 Keith Hines as Simmons
 Randy McPherson as Kovak
 Hector Luis Bustamante as Officer Ruiz
 Kathryn Joosten as Officer Louise
 Johnny Messner as Mr. Jones
 Glenn Morshower as Lieutenant Leifitz
 Jamie McShane as Joe Mack
 Jimmy Pinchak as Sean Mack

Production
The film's plot is roughly the same as Crais's novel. The main difference is that the novel's complicated subplot involving powerful West Coast Mafia crime lord Sonny Benza was removed, with the film giving little explanation of Walter Smith's criminal associates. The film also makes the first group of hostage-takers somewhat younger in age than depicted in the novel. In addition, the criminal syndicate in the film were portrayed as mysterious criminals rather than a regular Mafia.

Filming took place in the Malibu area (in western Los Angeles County). The exterior views of Smith's lavishly appointed house were filmed at a real house in the unincorporated Topanga Canyon area, between Malibu and Los Angeles; the interior scenes were done on sound stages in Hollywood.

The character Mars, played by Ben Foster, was modeled after Bay Area rap artist Mars by Robert Crais after a friend Dennis Bsharah urged him to look into the horrorcore genre. In the movie adaptation, Foster strongly resembles the rapper.  Jonathan Tucker's name was later changed to Dennis.

The movie's opening scenes were filmed in the Boyle Heights neighborhood of East Los Angeles, just east of downtown.

The fictional city of Bristo Camino was possibly intended to be a representation of Ojai or Moorpark. Bristo Bay is the name of Bristo Camino in the 2001 Robert Crais novel.

Release

Home media
Hostage was released on DVD & VHS June 21, 2005.

Reception

Box office
The film earned $34.6 million at the United States box office and a total worldwide gross of $77.6 million.

It made $9.8 million from 2,123 theaters in its opening weekend, finishing fourth.

Critical response  

On Rotten Tomatoes the film holds an approval rating of 35% based on 158 reviews, with an average rating of 5.08/10. The website's critics consensus reads, "Grisly and cliched, audiences may feel they're being held Hostage." On Metacritic, the film has a weighted average score of 44 out of 100 based on 33 critics, indicating "mixed or average reviews". Audiences polled by CinemaScore gave the film an average grade of "B+" on an A+ to F scale.

Roger Ebert gave the film three stars out of four, writing: "In scenes where a hero must outgun four or five armed opponents, however, Hostage does use the reliable action movie technique of cutting from one target to the next, so that we never see what the others are doing while the first ones are being shot. Waiting for their closeups, I suppose."

See also

 The Aggression Scale—a film with a similar premise
 List of films featuring home invasions

References

External links
 
 
 Filming Locations
 

2005 films
2005 action thriller films
2005 crime thriller films
2005 drama films
2000s action drama films
2000s American films
2000s crime action films
2000s crime drama films
2000s English-language films
2000s German films
American action drama films
American action thriller films
American crime action films
American crime drama films
American crime thriller films
American neo-noir films
English-language German films
Films about kidnapping
Films about arson
Films about death
Films about families
Films about hostage takings
Films about siblings
Films based on American novels
Films based on crime novels
Films set in California
Films scored by Alexandre Desplat
German action thriller films
German crime drama films
German crime thriller films
German thriller drama films
Home invasions in film